The Minnesota Correctional Facility – Willow River/Moose Lake is a two-site prison operated by the Minnesota Department of Corrections in Pine and Carlton counties.

The Moose Lake men's prison is located on the former site of the Moose Lake Regional Treatment Center in Moose Lake, Minnesota.

The Willow River facility, also for men, is located in Willow River, Minnesota. In 1992, the state's Challenge Incarceration Program (CIP), a military-style boot camp correctional program, began at the site. Only the first of three phases takes place at the Willow River facility.

References

Prisons in Minnesota
Buildings and structures in Carlton County, Minnesota
Buildings and structures in Pine County, Minnesota
Defunct hospitals in Minnesota
1988 establishments in Minnesota